The depiction of LGBTQ characters in animated series in the 2010s changed significantly from the previous decade; especially in Western animation. One of the shows cited as being the most influential for this change in representation is Steven Universe, created by Rebecca Sugar and aired on Cartoon Network. As GLAAD put it in their 2019-2020 report, the show continues to "go above and beyond when it comes to inclusive storytelling." The 2010s also brought with it shows such as Adventure Time, The Legend of Korra, and She-Ra and the Princesses of Power, all of which had strong LGBTQ characters.

For a further understanding of how these LGBTQ characters fit into the overall history of animation, please read the History of LGBTQ characters in animated series: 2010s page.

2010–14

The years of 2010 to 2014 saw LGBTQ characters premiere in various animated series. For instance, in 2010, Adventure Time began airing on Cartoon Network, where Rebecca Sugar, a storyboarder, laid the groundwork for a "queer cartoon couple" in the aforementioned show. A few years later, Sugar created Steven Universe, a show described as groundbreaking for depicting same-sex relationships which was praised for its LGBTQ representation. In 2014, The Legend of Korra broke barriers in Western animation by featuring an openly LGBTQ protagonist named Korra. The same year, Bojack Horseman, with lesbian, gay, and asexual characters, premiered, while transgender characters had a prominent role in Wandering Son. Furthermore, there were LGBTQ characters in animated shows such as Clarence, Mike Tyson Mysteries, Bravest Warriors, and Bob's Burgers. These stories set the stage for those to come in the later part of the decade, 2015–2019.

2015–19

The years of 2015 to 2019 saw the number of LGBTQ characters, building upon progress from 2010 to 2014,  in animated series increase. This includes series like The Loud House, beginning in 2016, OK K.O.! Let's Be Heroes in 2017, She-Ra and the Princesses of Power in 2018, and Twelve Forever in 2019. The latter three shows were praised for their LGBTQ representation, progressive characters and storylines, and queer characters. Additionally, LGBTQ characters appeared in Steven Universe, Macross Delta, RWBY, Kiznaiver, Mysticons, Craig of the Creek, Castlevania, Carole & Tuesday. In 2019 alone, LGBTQ characters were featured in shows such as Twelve Forever, Hazbin Hotel, The Dragon Prince, Danger & Eggs, gen:LOCK, and Astra Lost in Space. Of these shows,  She-Ra and the Princesses of Power and Steven Universe Future, renowned for their LGBTQ representation, came to an end in May 2020 and March 2020 respectfully.

See also

 List of yuri works
 List of yaoi anime and manga
 List of LGBT-related films by year
 List of animated films with LGBT characters

References

LGBT
2010s-related lists
Animated
LGBT 2010s
 2010s
 2010s
2010s LGBT-related television series